Bishop Burch may refer to:
Charles Sumner Burch (1854–1920), Episcopal bishop of New York
William Gerald Burch (1911-2003), Canadian Anglican bishop